The Virginia Slims of Milwaukee was a women's tennis tournament that took place in Milwaukee, United States and was the only time that a professional tennis tournament took place in Milwaukee and was part of the 1971 Virginia Slims Circuit. The event took place from January 21 to 24, 1971 and saw Billie Jean King take out the singles and doubles with partner Rosie Casals.

Finals

Singles
 Billie Jean King defeated  Rosie Casals 6–1, 6–2

Doubles
 Billie Jean King /  Rosie Casals defeated  Françoise Dürr /  Ann Jones 6–3, 1–6, 6–2

References

VS of Milwaukee 
VS of Milwaukee